Levansucrase is an enzyme that catalyzes the chemical reaction

sucrose + (2,6-beta-D-fructosyl)n  glucose + (2,6-beta-D-fructosyl)n+1

Thus, the two substrates of this enzyme are sucrose and (2,6-beta-D-fructosyl)n, whereas its two products are glucose and (2,6-beta-D-fructosyl)n+1.

This enzyme belongs to the family of glycosyltransferases, specifically the hexosyltransferases.  The systematic name of this enzyme class is sucrose:2,6-beta-D-fructan 6-beta-D-fructosyltransferase. Other names in common use include sucrose 6-fructosyltransferase, beta-2,6-fructosyltransferase, and beta-2,6-fructan:D-glucose 1-fructosyltransferase.  This enzyme participates in starch and sucrose metabolism and two-component system - general.

Structural studies

References

 
 
 

EC 2.4.1
Enzymes of known structure

SacB counter-selection relies on the toxic product produced by the SacB gene. sacB comes from the gram-positive bacteria Bacillus subtilis and encodes the enzyme levansucrase that converts sucrose into a toxic metabolite in gram-negative bacteria. Plating on sucrose medium will select for cells that contain constructs that have lost the sacB gene.